André Filipe Ferreira Coelho Pereira (born 5 May 1995) is a Portuguese professional footballer who plays for Rio Ave F.C. as a forward.

Club career

Early years and Porto
Pereira was born in the village of Milheirós in Maia, Porto District. He spent his first years as a senior in the lower leagues, starting out at Varzim SC's reserves.

On 31 January 2017, having scored eight competitive goals for A.D. Sanjoanense – six in the third division – Pereira signed a two-and-a-half-year contract with FC Porto, being assigned to their reserves in the Segunda Liga. He made his debut in the latter competition on 19 February, coming on as a late substitute in a 0–0 home draw against C.D. Santa Clara. His maiden appearance in the Primeira Liga with the first team occurred nine months later, when he played the last minutes of the 1–1 away draw to C.D. Aves; his first official match had taken place the previous week, when he provided the assist for Yacine Brahimi in injury time of the 3–2 win over Portimonense S.C. in the fourth round of the Taça de Portugal.

On 31 January 2018, Pereira was loaned to fellow league club Vitória F.C. until 30 June. He scored his first goal for them in only his second appearance, but in a 1–3 loss at S.C. Braga.

Pereira was also loaned for the 2019–20 season, starting at Vitória de Guimarães and finishing at Real Zaragoza (Spanish Segunda División).

Rio Ave
On 31 August 2020, Pereira joined Rio Ave F.C. as Mehdi Taremi moved in the opposite direction. The following 15 January, after only one minute on the pitch in a league fixture against Sporting CP, he suffered a serious knee injury after performing a defensive tackle, being sidelined for the rest of the campaign.

Honours
Porto
Primeira Liga: 2017–18
Supertaça Cândido de Oliveira: 2018

Rio Ave
Liga Portugal 2: 2021–22

References

External links

Portuguese League profile 

1995 births
Living people
People from Maia, Portugal
Sportspeople from Porto District
Portuguese footballers
Association football forwards
Primeira Liga players
Liga Portugal 2 players
Campeonato de Portugal (league) players
Varzim S.C. players
S.C. Espinho players
A.D. Sanjoanense players
FC Porto B players
FC Porto players
Vitória F.C. players
Vitória S.C. players
Rio Ave F.C. players
Segunda División players
Real Zaragoza players
Portuguese expatriate footballers
Expatriate footballers in Spain
Portuguese expatriate sportspeople in Spain